Not Drowning, Waving (styled as not drowning, waving) were a musical group formed in Melbourne, Australia, in 1983 by David Bridie and John Phillips. Their music combined elements of rock, ambient music and world music; their lyrics dealt with characteristically Australian topics: word-pictures of landscapes and people, the seasons, and some political issues – such as Indonesia's invasion of East Timor. The group released six studio albums and two soundtracks until disbanding in 1994, they briefly reformed in 2001, 2003 and 2005–2006. From 2005 to 2007, they issued three compilation albums. Not Drowning, Waving won the ARIA Award for Best Independent Release at the ARIA Music Awards of 1992 for Proof, their soundtrack for the 1991 film of the same name. In 1991, Bridie and fellow members of Not Drowning, Waving, formed a side-project, My Friend The Chocolate Cake to play more acoustic-based material.

History

1983–1985: Beginnings and Another Pond
Not Drowning, Waving were formed in Melbourne, Australia in 1983 by David Bridie and John Phillips. Bridie and Phillips are trained in classical music and met when Bridie, on keyboards, was composing a track, "Moving Around" and asked Phillips to provide guitar. Their name is derived from Stevie Smith's poem "Not Waving but Drowning". Rowan McKinnon soon joined on bass guitar and they recorded "Moving Around" with a drum machine. Other atmospheric instrumentals were recorded at the LaTrobe University's music department's studio. "Moving Around" was released as their debut single in April 1984 on the Rampant Records label. Tim Cole on vocals and Russel Bradley on drums joined the group. Another Pond was released in January 1985. In September 1985, the band released a dance single, "Mr Pooh, (Do Be a Don't Be)".

1986–1992 :The Little Desert, Cold and the Crackle, Claim and Tabaran
Not Drowning, Waving's second album, The Little Desert was released in January 1986. Bridie and Phillips also worked on the soundtrack for Canoe Man, a documentary about canoe makers from Manus Island in Papua New Guinea. Their work resulted in a six-track extended play (EP), The Sing Sing, which was released in June. Other members of Not Drowning, Waving have included Penny Hewson and Andrew Carswell.

In June 1987, the band released their third studio album, Cold and the Crackle which was followed in December 1987 with an EP, I Did, recorded with Robby Douglas Turner on vocals. By 1989, Not Drowning, Waving left Rampant Records and signed with Mighty Boy to issue their fourth album, Claim in May. The album was voted 'Best Australian Album' on the Australian Rolling Stone Critics Poll in 1989. In 1989, Bradley, Bridie and Mountfort formed a side project, My Friend The Chocolate Cake, as an acoustic music group after Bridie took a holiday in New Zealand and wrote a collection of songs that did not fit into the Not Drowning, Waving style.

Later in 1989, the group visited Papua New Guinea playing several concerts and meeting George Telek (Moab Stringband, Painim Wok) with whom they later recorded two tracks for their next album, Tabaran which was released late in 1990. Tabaran was credited to Not Drowning, Waving and the Musicians of Rabaul, Papua New Guinea Featuring Telek. Helen Mountfort had joined on cello in 1990, and the group covered The Reels track "Kitchen Man" for a various artists' album, Used and Recovered By (1990). Not Drowning, Waving recorded the soundtrack for 1991 film Proof which was released in April 1992.

In May 1992, they were the support act for David Byrne at the State Theatre in Sydney, Australia, playing: Palau, Amidel, The Kiap Song, Crazy Birds, Willow Tree, Terra Nullius, Albert Namatjira, The Migrant, and Sing Sing.

At the ARIA Music Awards of 1992, Tabaran was nominated for ARIA Award for Best Indigenous Release, while Proof won ARIA Award for Best Independent Release.

1993–1994 :Circus and break up
In 1993, the group released their sixth studio album Circus, which was recorded at the Rockfield Studios in Wales and produced by Hugh Jones.

In 1994, they were the support act for Peter Gabriel on his first tour of Australia. Late in the year, Bridie and Montfort recorded the soundtrack for the film Hammers Over the Anvil, they used Jen Anderson on violin (ex-The Black Sorrows) and the horn section from Hunters & Collectors. It was released in 1994 as Hammers under the name Not Drowning, Waving. The group disbanded in 1994, while Bridie and Mountfort continued with their offshoot venture, My Friend The Chocolate Cake.

2001–2007: Reunions
In November 2001, a short reunion of Not Drowning, Waving – consisting of Bradley, Bridie, Mountfort, Phillips and Southall in the line-up – occurred at the Corner Hotel in Richmond for the book launch of Blunt: A Biased History of Australian Rock.

In February 2003, they reunited again for The Morning Star Concert for West Papua at the Melbourne Concert Hall.

Another reunion, for several months, started in March 2005 when the band, together with Telek, performed twice at the 2005 WOMADelaide festival. Several other performances followed – at the 10th Fest'Napuan in Port Vila, Vanuatu; the Corner Hotel; and the Northcote Social Club, Northcote. The band's final show with the full lineup took place at Festival Melbourne 2006 in the Alexandra Gardens, a free concert for Melbourne's Commonwealth Games celebrations on 25 March 2006. During this time they issued two compilation albums, Through the One Last Door – Best Of (2005) and Maps for Sonic Adventurers (2006). A live album of performances from 1986 to 2005 was released as Live (At the Butchers' Picnic) in 2007.

Members
Band members have included:
Russel Bradley – drums, percussion (1987–1993, 1996)
David Bridie – piano, keyboards, vocals (1983–1993, 1996, 2001, 2003, 2005–2006)
Amanda Brotchie – vocals (1985–1987)
Andrew Carswell – mandolin
Tim Cole – vocals (1984–1992, 1996)
Phillip Flinker – (1984–1987)
Darren Geraghty – (1984–1987)
Penny Hewson – acoustic guitar
Rowan McKinnon – bass guitar, guitar (1984–1993, 1996)
Helen Mountfort – cello, vocals (1989–1993, 1996)
John Phillips – guitar, samples, sounds (1983–1993, 1996, 2001, 2003, 2005–2006)
Tanya Plack – flute (1985–1986)
Jaqui Rutten – vocals (1984–1987)
Tanya Smith – keyboards (1984–1987)
James Southall – percussion (1987–1993, 1996)
Phillip Wale – cello (1985–1986)

Discography

Studio albums

Soundtracks

Compilation and remix albums

Extended plays

Singles

Awards

ARIA Music Awards
The ARIA Music Awards is an annual awards ceremony that recognises excellence, innovation, and achievement across all genres of Australian music. Not Drowning, Waving has won one award from six nominations.

|-
| 1990
| Claim
| Best Adult Contemporary Album
| 
|-
|rowspan="3"| 1992
| Proof
| Best Independent Release
| 
|-
| Proof
| Best Original Soundtrack / Cast / Show Recording
| 
|-
| Tabaran
| Best Indigenous Release
| 
|-
| 1994
| Circus
| Best Indigenous Release
| 
|-
| 2007
| Maps for Sonic Adventures
| Best World Music Album
| 
|-

References

General
  Note: Archived [on-line] copy has limited functionality.
Specific

External links
Follow The Geography

ARIA Award winners
Musical groups from Melbourne
Musical groups established in 1983